The 1977–78 season was Sport Lisboa e Benfica's 74th season in existence and the club's 44th consecutive season in the top flight of Portuguese football, covering the period from 1 July 1977 to 30 June 1978. Benfica competed domestically in the Primeira Divisão and the Taça de Portugal, and participated in the European Cup after winning the previous league.

After John Mortimore secured the third consecutive league title, Benfica strengthened their squad with Humberto Coelho. Still, they lost players like Nelinho, Artur Correia and Carlos Alhinho. In the league, Benfica campaign started with a draw against Sporting on 3 September, but they won all remaining matches in that month. They drew again in October, before racking up seven consecutive wins that propelled them to first place. In Europe, they knocked-out Torpedo Moscow and Boldklubben 1903 in the first two rounds. Domestically, the second half of the season was not so dominant. They allowed themselves to be caught by Porto at the top of the table and were knocked of the Portuguese Cup by Sporting and the European Cup by Liverpool. In the final stages of the Primeira Divisão, Benfica intertwined wins with draws and were overtaken by Porto. The decisive Clássico in May, Porto secured a 1–1 draw after trailing most of the game, putting them on the course to win the league. Two weeks later, an unbeaten Benfica came second to Porto due to a 15 goal deficit.

Season summary
Benfica started the new season as three time Champion for the second time in the decade. In the transfer window, Benfica brought back Humberto Coelho and others like Celso Pita. Departing players included Nelinho, Artur Correia and Carlos Alhinho. One of biggest sagas of the transfer window was the return of Rui Jordão to Portugal, which Benfica approached to re-sign, but the player refused and insisted on going to rivals Sporting. The pre-season began on 1 August, without Humberto and Toni, who were still competing in the United States. The training sessions were mostly spent around 
Monsanto, and the first preparation game was on 11 August with Portimonense in Estádio do Jamor. Afterwards they travelled to Seville to take part in the Trofeo Ciudad de Sevilla, with Sevilla and Vasas.

Benfica started defending their league title on 3 September in the Derby de Lisboa with Sporting. They drew 1–1 with Jordão starting for Sporting and Humberto for Benfica. Throughout the month, Benfica won all remaining league matches and finished the month in first place. In the European Cup, they progressed to the second round after beating Torpedo Moscow on penalties, with Bento making an important contribution. In the opening league game of October, Benfica drew in Bessa with Boavista and was caught by Vitória de Guimarães in first, both with 8 points. Four days later, Benfica met Boldklubben 1903 for the second round of the European Cup, beating them with a goal from Pietra.
Pietra would also score in Denmark, helping Benfica qualify for the quarter-finals. Meanwhile, domestically, after the draw in Bessa, Benfica won all remaining league matches in 1977, finishing the year in first with 21 points, four more than Sporting and Porto, who still had a game in hand. They resumed their league campaign with the reception to Porto in the Clássico on 15 January. They drew 0–0 and kept Porto at bay, retaining a two-point lead over them. Benfica won the next three matches, one of them a Derby against Sporting with a goal from Vítor Baptista, who subsequently lost an earring, an episode he was best remembered. On 19 February, in a visit to Estádio do Restelo, Benfica drew 0–0 with Belenenses and lost a point to Porto, reducing their lead to a single point.

Benfica began March with a home loss to Liverpool in the first leg of the quarter-finals of the European Cup. Four days later, they were knocked-out of the Portuguese Cup by Sporting, with a 3–1 loss. It was the third consecutive year that Sporting had eliminated them from the competition. On 12 March, they dropped points in the league again, in another 0–0, now with Varzim. This result put Benfica at risk of being caught in the top of the table by Porto, which had a game in hand. Three days later, Benfica lost 4–1 in Anfield Road and were eliminated of the European Cup. Toni said the result expressed the difference between both teams. Back at domestic competition, Benfica regained their footing and won the following two matches. However, on 8 April, they drew again, at home with Portimonense and fell to second, a point from Porto. They responded with two more wins, before conceding another draw, the eight all season, against Braga. This opened Porto's lead to two points with five matches to go. As they had done before, Benfica reacted and won two more matches, one them in Bonfim, where Bento was sent-off. This allowed them to reduce Porto's lead to a point, after their rivals had slipped. This made the visit to Estádio das Antas on 28 May, a title defining match. On that day, Benfica scored first on the 3rd minute with Porto levelling it on the 83rd minute, thus keeping them at the front. From the match, Toni said "It was the divine providence that saved Porto". In the second-to-last match, Porto drew away and Benfica won, which tied both teams with the same points, although Porto remained leader with a better goal-average. On the final match-day, Benfica won, but so did Porto, which celebrated their first title in 19 years. Despite going unbeaten all season and only conceding 11 goals, they had lost the title by a 15-goal deficit.

Competitions

Overall record

Primeira Divisão

League table

Results by round

Matches

Taça de Portugal

European Cup

First round

Second round

Quarter-finals

Friendlies

Player statistics
The squad for the season consisted of the players listed in the tables below, as well as staff member John Mortimore (manager), Rui Silva (assistant manager).

Transfers

In

Out

Out by loan

See also
List of unbeaten football club seasons

References

Bibliography
 
 

S.L. Benfica seasons
Benfica